George William Hamilton (March 23, 1933 – January 21, 2022)  was an American politician and businessman.

Hamilton lived in Wilmington, Vermont, and was involved in the real estate business. He served in the Vermont House of Representatives and was a Republican.

References

1933 births
2022 deaths
People from Wilmington, Vermont
Businesspeople from Vermont
Republican Party members of the Vermont House of Representatives